The following is the list of cities and villages in Moldova that underwent a name change in the past.

Cities
 Cupcini → (1961) Kalininsk → (1990) Cupcini
 Ghindești → (1956) Leninskii → (1992) Ghindești
 Hîncești → (1940) Kotovskoe → (1941) Hîncești → (1944) Kotovskoe → (1965) Kotovsk → (1990) Hîncești 
 Ialoveni → (25.03.1977) Kutuzov → (31.03.1989) Ialoveni
 Sîngerei → (07.04.1965) Lazovsk → (1991) Sîngerei
 Șoldănești → (05.05.1985) Chernenko → (1988) Șoldănești 
 Căinari → (13.08.1985) Dumbraveny/Dumbrăveni → (1991) Căinari
 Chizil → (28.12.1949) Biruința (Suvorov/Volintiri) → (23.12.1964) Suvorovo → (24.05.1990) Ștefan Vodă
 Pașcani pe Bîc → Novaia Nikolaevka → (1926) Anenii Noi 
 Romanovca → (11.09.1957) Bessarabka → Basarabeasca  1990
 Șcheia → Frumoasa → Cahul
 Starovka → Mărculești
 Șop Taraclia → Taraclia
 Tighina → Bender
 Vadul lui Ștefan Vodă → Vadul lui Vodă

Villages
 Akendorf → (28.11.1949) Doina
 Alexandru Ioan Cuza → (1940?) Hadji-Abdul → (21.12.1960) Suvorovo (Vulcănești district) → (1990) Alexandru Ioan Cuza (Cahul district)
 Badicu Rus → (25.03.1977) Rumianțevo (Cahul district) → (?)
 Bezeni → (27.08.1966) Donici (Orhei district)
 Balan → (21.11.1973) Malinovscoe (Rîșcani district) → (?)
 Belești → (23.01.1965) Drăgușeni (Hîncești district)
 Beșeni → (23.01.1965) Codru (Telenești/Lazo district)
 Bișcotari → (02.02.1978) Codreni (Cimișlia district)
 Borceag → (03.07.1950) Biruința (Taraclia/Congaz district)
 Broasca → (23.01.1965) Floreni (Anenii Noi district)
 Buga → (27.04.1977) Dolinnoe (Criuleni district)
 Bîzdîga → (27.04.1977) Luminița → (?)
 Caitanovca → (28.10.1949) Pervomaiscoe (Drochia district)
 Cardaș → (03.07.1950) Frumușica (Comrat/Congaz district)
 Carol al II-lea → (11.03.1955) Stepnoe (Glodeni district)
 Cenușa → (23.01.1965) Frunzeni (Florești district) → Cenușa (?)
 Cicur → (03.07.1950) Roșița (Taraclia district) → (?)
 Chetrosu Neamț → (03.07.1950) Williams / Вильямс (Anenii Noi district) (later merged with nearby Chetrosu [Bîc])
 Chetrosu Bîc → (13.09.1962) Chetrosu (Anenii Noi district)
 Chișcăreni → (08.07.1955) Lazo → (1990/92) Chișcăreni (Sîngerei district)
 Chircanii Noi → (08.06.1958) Lebedenco (Cahul district)
 Chircăiești → (20.08.1976) Chircăieștii Noi
 Cîmpeni → (?) Alexanderfeld
 Cobîlca → (22.08.1968) Codreanca (Strășeni district)
 Curleni → (03.02.1986) Podgoreni (Rezina district)
 Curluceni → (03.02.1986) Făgureni (Strășeni district)
 Cîrlăneni → (03.07.1950) Kotovskii (Taraclia district)
 Cîrlani → (23.01.1965) Stejăreni (Călărași / Strășeni district)
 Colonia-Rîșcani → Malinovskoe (Rîșcani district)
 Cocuirgoi → (03.07.1950) Spicoasa (Taraclia district)
 Coiuceni → (23.01.1965) Pruteni (Fălești district)
 Cuza Vodă → (1948) Voroșilovca (Bălți district) → (23.01.1961) Lazo (Drochia district)
 Cuza Vodă → (29.09.1949) Dimitrovca (Cimișlia district)
 Decebal → (07.02.1946) Tătărăuca Mică / Malaia Tatarovka (Dondușeni/Zgurița district)
 Dolna → (20.05.1949) Pușkino → Dolna
 Dragoș Vodă → (03.09.1951) Iliciovca (Drochia district)
 Dunduc → (09.11.1961) Mirnoe (Anenii Noi district)
 Dușman → (1948) Voroșilovca → (23.01.1961) Octeabriscoe (Glodeni district)
 Kotovsk → Regina Maria (Soroca district) ?
 Regina Maria (Hîncești district) → (29.09.1949) Semionovca (Leova/Cărpineni district)
 Kirlannar → (1950) Cotovscoe (Găgăuzia)
 Denevița Nouă / Novaia Denevița → (03.07.1950) Svetlîi (Găgăuzia)
 Emental → (29.09.1949) Pervomaisk (Căușeni district)
 Flămînda → Calea Nouă (Baimaclia district)
 Fundoaia → (03.02.1986) Maiscoe (Florești district) 
 Fundu Culi → (23.01.1965) Izvoreni (Ungheni district)
 Ghizdita → (23.01.1965) Fîntînița
 Ghică Vodă → (28.10.1949) Miciurin
 Iacobstal → (26.09.1947) Alava (Căușeni district)
 Iacobstal → (28.11.1949) Lazo (Căușeni district)
 Ion Brătianu → (28.11.1946) Kotovskoe (Soroca/Bălți district)
 Îndărătnici → (05.05.1985) Nucăreni (Telenești district)
 Manukbeevka / Манукбеевка → (23.01.1965) Frumușica (Leova)
 Marienfeld → (23.01.1965) Pervomaisk (Cimișlia)
 Mitropolit → (18.12.1946) Porumbrei
 Mihai-Bravo → (28.11.1946) Mihailovca (Florești)
 Mihailovca → (20.06.1984) Mihailovca Nouă (Rîbnița)
 Mihia Vodă → (29.09.1949) Ceapaevca (Tîrnova)
 Molovata → (25.01.1978) Molovata Nouă (Dubăsari)
 Mîndîc → (23.01.1965) Livădeni (Drochia)
 Nădușita → (10.05.1963) Gribova (Drochia)
 Neifeld → (30.03.1950) Tkacenko (Dubăsari)
 Nikolaevka → (11.06.1964) Iliciovca (Florești)
 Nikolaevka → (23.01.1965) Vîlcele (Leova)
 Niorcani → (03.02.1986) Poienița (Dondușeni)
 Novoselovka → (17.03.1983) Kotovskoe (Orhei)
 Țiganca Nouă → (11.06.1964) Stoianovca Nouă (Cahul)
 Opinca → (07.05.1945) Suvorovka (Fălești/Lazo district)
 Pervomaisk → (23.01.1965) Berezovka (Dondușeni)
 Piatra → (29.07.1949) Lazo (Orhei district)
 Rediul 1 → (03.02.1986) Rediul de Sus (Fălești District)
 Rediul 2 → (03.02.1986) Rediul de Jos (Fălești District)
 Roșcani → (20.06.1984) Roșcanii de Sus (Rezina district)
 Sinodinovca → (28.09.1950) Pervomaisc(oe) (Lazo district)
 Slănina → (23.01.1965) Lozeni (Drochia district)
 Spărieți → (26.03.1982) Șipoteni (Kotovsk district)
 Sîngereii Vechi → (07.04.1965) Lazovsk (Lazo district)
 Sturzeni → (23.01.1965) Ucrainca (Căușeni district)
 Suric → (02.02.1978) Mugureni (Cimișlia district)
 Sfînta Vineri → (28.11.1949) Frunze (Strășeni district)
 Telpiz → (03.07.1950) Dimitrovo (Taraclia/Comrat district)
 Troian → (07.02.1946) Slobozia Nouă (Otaci district)
 Trubaevka → (26.03.1982) Iujnoe (Vulcănești district) → (?)
 Țaregrad → (30.10.1945) Glavan (Drochia district)
 Valea Jdanului → (23.01.1965) Victoria (Leova district)
 Valea Popii → (23.01.1965) Noroceni
 Varvarî → (03.02.1986) Prioziornoe (Slobozia district) → (?)
 Vertiujeni → (11.06.1964) Pridnestrovskoe (Camenca district) → (?)
 Voinescu → (10.09.1946) Pobeda (Kotovsk district) → (?)
 Vălcineț → (23.01.1965) Maiovca (Ocnița district)
 Voroșilovka → (10.04.1958) Octeabriscoe (Camenca district) → (?)

See also
List of renamed cities in Belarus
List of cities in Moldova
List of renamed places in Romania
List of renamed cities and towns in Russia
List of renamed cities in Ukraine

References

Further reading 

Топонимия Ближнего Зарубежья: 100 лет переименований. Атлас-справочник / Науч. ред. В.Н. Калуцков; авт.: . – М.: б.и., 2020. – 255 с. – ISBN 978-5-6044923-0-7 (in Russian)

Populated places in Moldova
Renamed, Moldova
Moldova
Moldova geography-related lists
Moldova